Indian Creek is an unincorporated community located in the town of Lorain, Polk County, Wisconsin, United States.  It derives its name from the small, intermittent creek located near the community.

Notes

Unincorporated communities in Polk County, Wisconsin
Unincorporated communities in Wisconsin